Thyra, also known as Thorvi or Thyre, was a Danish queen, spouse of King Gorm the Old of Denmark, the first historically recognized King of Denmark, who reigned from  to his death  or .

Historical facts and uncertainties
She is believed to have led an army against the Germans. Gorm and Thyra were the parents of King Harald Bluetooth.

While Gorm the Old had disparaging nicknames, his wife Thyra was referred to as a woman of great prudence. Saxo Grammaticus wrote that Thyra was mainly responsible for building the Danevirke on the southern border, but archeology has proven it to be much older, and Thyra's role was to extend it.

Thyra died before Gorm, who raised a memorial stone to Thyra at Jelling, which refers to her as the "Pride of Denmark" or the "Ornament of Denmark" (Old Danish: tanmarka but, Modern Danish: Dannebod). Gorm and Thyra were buried under one of the two great mounds at Jelling, and later moved to the first Christian church there. This was confirmed when a tomb containing their remains was excavated in 1978 under the east end of the present church.

Accounts of Thyra's parentage are late, contradictory and chronologically dubious. Saxo names her father as Ethelred, King of England (usually identified with Æthelred of Wessex), but his description of her brother as Æthelstan suggests he intended Edward the Elder, though no such daughter appears in the detailed lists of Edward's children that survive.  Jómsvíkinga saga and Snorri's Heimskringla say her father was a king or jarl of Jutland or Holstein called Harald Klak.

Tradition also has it that before Thyra consented to marry Gorm, she insisted he build a new house and sleep in it for the first three nights of winter and give her an account of his dreams those nights. The dreams were told at the wedding banquet and as recorded, imitate the dreams Pharaoh had that were interpreted by Joseph in Genesis. In the first dream, three white boars came out of the sea, fed on the grass, and went back to the sea. In the second, three red boars came out of the sea, and did the same.  In the third dream, three black boars with great tusks did the same, but when they returned to the sea, there was such a loud rush of the waves returning to the land that the noise could be heard throughout Denmark.

Thyra's interpretation was that the three white boars represented three very cold, snowy winters which would kill "all the fruits of the ground." The red boars meant there would next be three mild winters, while the black boars with tusks indicated there would be wars in the land. The fact that they all went back into the sea showed that their effect would not be long-lasting. The loud noise as the waves of the sea rolled back on the Danish shores meant that "mighty men would come on the land with great wars, and many of his relations would take part."  She said that had he dreamed of the black boars and the rushing waves the first night, she would not have married him, but now, since she would be available to provide advice, there would be little injury from the wars.

Asteroid 115 Thyra is named in her honour.

See also
 Jelling stone ship

Bibliography
 Saxo Grammaticus: The History of the Danes Vol II. Davidson, Hilda Ellis and Fisher, Peter. (1980) D. S. Brewer: Cambridge
 Salmonson, Jessica Amanda. (1991) The Encyclopedia of Amazons. Paragon House. Page 251.

Footnotes

Danish royal consorts
House of Knýtlinga
Women in medieval European warfare
10th-century Danish people
10th-century Danish women